Enrique Montserrat (19 September 1935 – 6 January 2022) was a Spanish gymnast. He competed in eight events at the 1960 Summer Olympics.

References

1935 births
2022 deaths
Spanish male artistic gymnasts
Olympic gymnasts of Spain
Gymnasts at the 1960 Summer Olympics
Gymnasts from Barcelona